Tonga'uiha is a surname. Notable people with the surname include:

Soane Tonga'uiha (born 1982), Tongan-born, New Zealand-educated, rugby union footballer
Hudson Tonga'uiha (born 1983), Tongan rugby union footballer

Tongan-language surnames